"Particula" is a song performed by American electronic music trio Major Lazer from their EP Know No Better (2017). The song features DJ Maphorisa and vocals by South African rapper Nasty C, Nigerian artists Ice Prince and Patoranking, and Nigerian-American hip hop recording artist Jidenna.

Background 
"Particula" was released on October 12, 2017 on iTunes.

Music video 
The music video, directed by South African filmmaker Adriaan Louw, was unveiled on October 17, 2017 via the official YouTube channel of the band and major streaming networks. The visual offers an alternative view on a 70's inspired culture. The video was filmed and shot in Johannesburg, South Africa., the video has surpassed 50 million views.

Reception
Adriaan Louw of Word Africa Production in a press release said they "wanted it to feel like we were shooting a documentary in the 70's". He added, "I've always wanted to shoot a film like this in Johannesburg. It was creating an ideal world within Joburg that was based in the 70's. I wanted it to feel like we were shooting a documentary in the 70's of the culture that could have been in a city where Disco, Funk, Fela Kuti was everywhere. We worked with some great artist who featured on the track. Jidenna flew in all the way from the states and Ice Prince came down from Nigeria. Was also my first time working with fellow South African's Nasty C and DJ Maphorisa."

Credits and personnel
Credits adapted from YouTube.
 Adriaan Louw – Director
 Daniel Siegler – Executive Producer
 Allison Swank – Producer
 Thomas Revington – Director of Photography
 Tamzyn Botha – Art Director
 Xavier Van Der Westhuizen – Editor
 Matshepo Maja – Production Manager

Charts

References

2017 singles
2017 songs
Major Lazer songs
Ice Prince songs
Jidenna songs
Nasty C songs
Patoranking songs
Songs written by Diplo
Songs written by Jr Blender